is a former Japanese football player.

Playing career
Takaki was born in Kumamoto on September 1, 1982. He joined J1 League club Shimizu S-Pulse from youth team in 2001. Although he could not become a regular player, he played many matches as mainly left side midfielder for a long time. The club won the champions 2001 Emperor's Cup and 2nd place 2005 Emperor's Cup and 2008 J.League Cup. In July 2010, he moved to J2 League club Consadole Sapporo. He became a regular player as left side midfielder and side back and the club was promoted to J1 from 2012. In 2013, he moved to his first club Shimizu S-Pulse. However he could hardly play in the match. In March 2015, he moved to J1 club Montedio Yamagata. Although he played as right side midfielder and side back, the club was relegated to J2 end of 2015 season. In 2016, he moved to J2 club Tokyo Verdy. He played many matches as right midfielder. However his opportunity to play decreased from summer 2016 and he retired end of 2017 season.

Club statistics

References

External links

1982 births
Living people
Association football people from Kumamoto Prefecture
Japanese footballers
J1 League players
J2 League players
Shimizu S-Pulse players
Hokkaido Consadole Sapporo players
Montedio Yamagata players
Tokyo Verdy players
Association football defenders